This is a list of years in Germany. See also the timeline of German history.  For only articles about years in Germany that have been written, see :Category:Years in Germany.

21st century

20th century

19th century

18th century

17th century

See also
 Timeline of German history
 List of years by country

 
Germany history-related lists
Germany